Future Weather is an EP by American indie rock band The War on Drugs, released on October 26, 2010 on Secretly Canadian. Released on both twelve-inch vinyl and as a digital download, the EP precedes the band's second studio album, Slave Ambient, which feature tracks from this release in a re-recorded state.

In early 2011, former member Kurt Vile praised the track, "Brothers", stating, "Adam Granduciel's one of my best friends, so it strikes a chord."

Track listing
All songs written by Adam Granduciel.
"Come to the City #14"
"Baby Missiles"
"Comin' Through"
"A Pile of Tires"
"Comin' Around"
"Brothers"
"Missiles Reprise"
"The History of Plastic"

Personnel

The War on Drugs
Adam Granduciel - vocals, harmonica, acoustic and electric guitars, cassettes, synthesizers
Dave Hartley - bass guitar, autoharp (2), Stratocaster (2), traps (6)
Mike Zanghi - drums, percussion, Roland MC-202, bells, bowls, bi-phase treatments

Recording personnel
Adam Granduciel - recording, mixing
Jeff Zeigler - recording
John Congleton - recording
Brian McTear - mixing (2 & 3)
Johnny Low - mixing (2 & 3)
Paul Gold - mastering

Artwork
Adam Granduciel - photography
Daniel Murphy - layout

References

2010 EPs
The War on Drugs (band) albums
Albums produced by Adam Granduciel